Benson Shilongo (born 18 May 1992) is a Namibian professional footballer who plays as a forward for Israeli club Maccabi Bnei Reineh and the Namibia national team.

International career

International goals
Scores and results list Namibia's goal tally first.

References

External links 
 

1992 births
Living people
People from Ongwediva
Namibian men's footballers
Namibia international footballers
Association football forwards
United Africa Tigers players
Gaborone United S.C. players
Platinum Stars F.C. players
Pyramids FC players
Smouha SC players
Ismaily SC players
Maccabi Bnei Reineh F.C. players
Egyptian Premier League players
Israeli Premier League players
Namibian expatriate footballers
Expatriate footballers in Egypt
Expatriate footballers in Israel
2019 Africa Cup of Nations players